Kuschelina is a genus of flea beetles in the family Chrysomelidae. There are some 30 described species, from the Nearctic and Neotropics.

Selected species

References

Further reading

 
 

Alticini
Chrysomelidae genera